Caledonia is an underground light rail transit (LRT) station under construction on Line 5 Eglinton, a new line that is part of the Toronto subway system. It will be located along Eglinton Avenue between the GO Transit Barrie rail corridor and the entrance to the Westside Mall.

In April 2014, the station's headwalls were tunnelled through. The station is scheduled to open in 2023.

Description
The main entrance will face Eglinton Avenue West and have a small station plaza. The station will include a bus loop with two bus bays, outdoor parking for 60 bicycles and retail spaces within the main entrance at ground level.

The underground station platform will be located on the north side of the Eglinton Avenue directly under the main entrance. The station design provides an opportunity to bring sunlight from this entrance down to the platform level via an open shaft from the upper concourse.

As part of a program to install artworks at major interchange stations along Line 5 Eglinton, Caledonia station will feature the artwork Ride of Your Life by Janice Kerbel, consisting of a series of large-scale mosaic wall works which will be visible from the Line 5 platform level. The artwork shows mosaic images of signage with multiple typefaces and sizes.

Caledonia GO Station
In May 2015, Metrolinx announced plans to add Caledonia as a future stop on the GO Transit Barrie line. The environmental assessment for the GO station was expected to be complete in early 2016. However, the GO station portion is not expected to open until 2024, after the opening of Line 5 Eglinton.

The LRT station will be integrated with the planned GO station. There will be a pedestrian bridge connecting the GO station to the LRT station's main entrance. The GO station will have a second entrance at its north end where both the York Beltline Trail and Bowie Avenue end. In future, through the Regional Rail Express project, a second track is planned for the GO line to enable all-day, two-way GO train service.

Surface connections 

, the following are the proposed connecting routes that would serve this station when Line 5 Eglinton opens:

References

External links
Caledonia Station project page at the Eglinton Crosstown website.
 published by Metrolinx on May 15, 2020, featuring a drone video of the partially built station

Line 5 Eglinton stations
Future GO Transit railway stations